Mesosa rondoni is a species of beetle in the family Cerambycidae. It was described by Stephan von Breuning in 1962. It is known from Laos.

Subspecies
 Mesosa rondoni rondoni Breuning, 1962
 Mesosa rondoni paravariegata Rondon & Breuning, 1970

References

rondoni
Beetles described in 1962